is a former Japanese football player. He played for the Japan national team.

Club career
Endo was born in Tokyo on August 15, 1970. After graduating from Juntendo University, he joined the Japan Football League club Júbilo Iwata in 1993. The club won the second place in 1994 and was promoted to the J1 League. Although he played as a regular player until 1995, he lost the opportunity to play from 1996. After 1999, he played for Yokohama FC (1999), Verdy Kawasaki (1999) and Shimizu S-Pulse (2000). In 2000, he moved to Belgium and played for Mechelen and La Louvière. He retired in 2002.

National team career
On May 29, 1994, Endo debuted for the Japan national team against France. He was also selected for the 1994 Asian Games and he played full time in all matches. He played eight games for Japan in 1994.

Club statistics

National team statistics

References

External links
 
 Japan National Football Team Database
 

1970 births
Living people
Juntendo University alumni
Association football people from Tokyo
Japanese footballers
Japan international footballers
J1 League players
Japan Football League (1992–1998) players
Japan Football League players
Júbilo Iwata players
Yokohama FC players
Tokyo Verdy players
Shimizu S-Pulse players
Japanese expatriate footballers
Expatriate footballers in Belgium
Belgian Pro League players
Association football defenders
Footballers at the 1994 Asian Games
Asian Games competitors for Japan